"The Wedding of Mrs. Fox"  is two German fairy tales collected under the same title by the Brothers Grimm in Grimm's Fairy Tales as number 38.  It was included in all editions, and is classified as Aarne-Thompson type 65, 1350, 1352*, and 1510.

The second version of the tale was told to the Grimms by Ludovico Brentano Jordis, who also wrote down "The Lion and the Frog" for the brothers.

Synopsis

In the first version of the story, Mr. Fox has nine tails. He feigns death to test his wife's fidelity. Mrs. Fox rejects all the fox suitors that have fewer than nine tails. When she gets engaged to another fox with nine tails, Mr. Fox arises and throws everyone out of his house, including his wife.

In the second version, Mr. Fox dies, and Mrs. Fox is suited by a dog, a deer, a hare, a bear, and a lion. She rejects them because they do not have red pants and a pointed face. When a fox arrives and meets her requirements, she agrees to marry him and laments her first husband's selfishness.

Motifs
The Grimms used the word "Zeiselschwänze" for "tails" when Mrs. Fox asks about her potential suitors in the first version of the story. The root "schwanz" creates a double entendre as it is also used to describe male genitalia.

In popular culture
"The Wedding of Mrs. Fox" is featured in Grimm's Fairy Tale Classics. In this version, the wealthy Mr. Fox is convinced by a devilish fox he encounters fishing that his beautiful wife is being unfaithful and convinces him to at first follow her though he finds no proof of infidelity so the devilish fox suggests he pretend he is dead, fooling both his wife and their feline maid. The first suitor is Mr. Fox's friend and Mrs. Fox is too busy mourning her husband to take suitors telling the maid to send him away. However when a second suitor appears the maid realizes that they will run out of money and convinces Mrs. Fox that she must find a suitor so she agrees but states he must have nine tails like her husband. Meanwhile, Mr. Fox feigns death while fighting his growing hunger though grows confident that his wife will remain faithful as she refuses each suitor until a wealthy younger fox with nine tails appears and she agrees, causing an angry Mr. Fox to confront the nine tailed suitor, the maid, and Mrs. Fox. However Mrs. Fox points out he was wrong to deceive his wife in such a manner as she had been faithful to him and only chose the suitor as she thought he was dead and thought she would have to provide for herself and the maid defends her mistress by attacking him as he had always mistreated his housekeeper. Mr. Fox chases them out of the house, but realizes he is now alone. The devilish fox is revealed to be the devil on his shoulder that makes one do bad things, causing Mr. Fox to angrily attack the devil only to destroy his house.

References

External links
 Etymology of "Zeiselschwänze"

Grimms' Fairy Tales
Fictional foxes
Literature featuring anthropomorphic foxes
Animal tales
Works about marriage
Female characters in fairy tales
ATU 1-99
ATU 1350-1439
ATU 1440-1524